is a 1984 Japanese short story by author Seiko Tanabe. It was first published in the June 1984 issue of Monthly Kadokawa. It was later included alongside various stories in the short story collection Josee, the Tiger and the Fish, which was published on March 27, 1985, by Kadokawa Shoten. Yen Press licensed it for an English release published it in March 2022.

Film adaptations

 Josee, the Tiger and the Fish, a 2003 Japanese live-action film
 Josée, a 2020 South Korean live-action film, based in part on the screenplay of the 2003 film
 Josee, the Tiger and the Fish, a 2020 Japanese animated film

References

External links

 Josee, the Tiger and the Fish at Kadokawa
 Official web page at Yen Press

1984 short stories
1985 short story collections
Japanese novels adapted into films
Japanese short stories
Japanese short story collections
Romance short stories
Short stories adapted into films
Works originally published in Japanese magazines
Yen Press titles